The Left-Handed Man is a 1913 American short drama film directed by  D. W. Griffith. Prints of the film survive at the film archive of the Museum of Modern Art.

Cast
 Lillian Gish as The Old Soldier's Daughter
 Charles West as The Old Soldier's Daughter's Sweetheart
 Harry Carey as The Thief
 Kathleen Butler as In Court
 William J. Butler as In Court
 William A. Carroll as Extra
 William Elmer as Policeman (as Billy Elmer)
 Frank Evans as Policeman
 Charles Gorman as In Bar
 Joseph McDermott as Policeman
 Alfred Paget as Policeman

See also
 Harry Carey filmography
 D. W. Griffith filmography
 Lillian Gish filmography

References

External links

1913 films
Films directed by D. W. Griffith
1913 short films
American silent short films
American black-and-white films
1913 drama films
Silent American drama films
Films with screenplays by Frank E. Woods
1910s American films